The 2020 Lyon Open (WTA) (also known as the Open 6ème Sens — Métropole de Lyon for sponsorship reasons) was a women's tennis tournament played on indoor hard courts. It was the first edition of the Lyon Open (WTA) and an International tournament on the 2020 WTA Tour. It took place at the Palais des Sports de Gerland in Lyon, France, from 2 to 8 March 2020.

Singles main draw entrants

Seeds 

1 Rankings as of 24 February 2020.

Other entrants 
The following players received wildcards into the main draw: 
  Clara Burel
  Daria Kasatkina
  Chloé Paquet

The following player received entry into the singles main draw using a protected ranking:
  Vera Lapko

The following players received entry from the qualifying draw:
  Irina Bara
  Jaqueline Cristian
  Magdalena Fręch
  Anastasiya Komardina 
  Marta Kostyuk
  Antonia Lottner

The following player received entry as a lucky loser:
  Lesley Pattinama Kerkhove

Withdrawals 
Before the tournament
  Ekaterina Alexandrova → replaced by  Anna-Lena Friedsam
  Paula Badosa → replaced by  Lesley Pattinama Kerkhove
  Margarita Gasparyan → replaced by  Pauline Parmentier
  Barbora Krejčíková → replaced by  Mandy Minella
  Anastasia Pavlyuchenkova → replaced by  Viktoriya Tomova
  Kristýna Plíšková → replaced by  Tereza Martincová

During the tournament
  Jil Teichmann (right ankle injury)

Doubles main draw entrants

Seeds 

 Rankings as of February 24, 2020.

Other entrants 
The following pairs received wildcards into the doubles main draw:
  Estelle Cascino /  Elsa Jacquemot 
  Chloé Paquet /  Pauline Parmentier

Champions

Singles 

  Sofia Kenin def.  Anna-Lena Friedsam, 6–2, 4–6, 6–4

Doubles 

  Laura Ioana Paar /  Julia Wachaczyk def.  Lesley Pattinama Kerkhove /  Bibiane Schoofs, 7–5, 6–4

References

External links 
 Official website

2020 in French tennis
2020 WTA Tour
2020 Open (WTA)
2020
March 2020 sports events in France